Isocolon is a rhetorical scheme in which parallel elements possess the same number of words or syllables. As in any form of parallelism, the pairs or series must enumerate like things to achieve symmetry. The scheme is called bicolon, tricolon, or tetracolon depending on whether they are two, three, or four parallel elements.

Etymology
The term, a compound of  ísos 'equal' and  kôlon 'member, clause' was used in the classical Greek rhetorical literature:

The Greek plural is 'isocola', but 'isocolons' is also used in English.

Bicolon

An example of bicolon is the advertising slogan "buy one, get one free" (you pay for one item but you get another free).

In Biblical poetry it is standard to see a pair of adjacent lines of poetry in which the second echoes the meaning of the first. This can be considered a bicolon. For example:
<blockquote>
 When Israel went out of Egypt, * the house of Jacob from a barbarous people:
 Judea made his sanctuary, * Israel his dominion.
 The sea saw and fled: * Jordan was turned back.
 The mountains skipped like rams, * and the hills like the lambs of the flock.
 What ailed thee, O thou sea, that thou didst flee: * and thou, O Jordan, that thou wast turned back?
 Ye mountains, that ye skipped like rams, * and ye hills, like lambs of the flock?
 At the presence of the Lord the earth was moved, * at the presence of the God of Jacob:
 Who turned the rock into pools of water, * and the stony hill into fountains of waters.
—Psalm 113:1-8 (Psalm 114 Hebrew)
</blockquote>

 Tricolon Veni, vidi, vici— (Julius Caesar)

"I came; I saw; I conquered."

A tricolon that comprises parts in increasing size, magnitude or intensity is called a tricolon crescens, or an ascending tricolon. Tricolon can sometimes be a hendiatris.

Similarly, tricolon that comprises parts that decrease in size, magnitude, intensity, or word length is called a tricolon diminuens, or a descending tricolon.

Abraham Lincoln used tricolon in many of his speeches. His Gettysburg Address has the following phrase: "We cannot dedicate – we cannot consecrate – we cannot hallow..." Lincoln wrote in his second inaugural address, "with malice toward none, with charity toward all, with firmness in the right...".

Winston Churchill used the tricolon frequently, as in his June 1941 speech regarding the German invasion of the Soviet Union, when he stated "It is a war in which the whole British Empire and Commonwealth of Nations is engaged without distinction of race, creed or party."

Repeating the same thing multiple times is a special case of an isocolon, as a way of saying that only one thing is important, and it is very important. In about 1500, when Louis XII asked Giangiacopo Trivulzio what was necessary to win the war against Ludovico Sforza, Trivulzio answered: "Three things, Sire, Money, money, money!" In the 20th century, the cliché "Location, location, location" was said to enumerate the three most important attributes of real property. This phrase appears in print in Chicago as early as 1926, but is nonetheless frequently credited, incorrectly, to the British real estate magnate Lord Harold Samuel.  British Prime Minister Tony Blair set out his priorities for office in 1997 with "Education, education, education".

Tetracolon

Tetracola are sometimes called "quatrains" (cf. the usual meaning of quatrain).

An example of a tetracolon may be cited from a poem by Gabriele D'Annunzio:

Another example can be cited from Richard II, by Shakespeare

Special cases
A special type of collocation known as an irreversible binomial is a bicolon that is both short and so well known that it becomes a fixed expression. Not all irreversible binomials are bicolons or tricolons, however. Irreversible binomials generally consist of only a few words at most.

Examples of irreversible binomials that are bicolons or tricolons:smoke and mirrorsalive and kickingcloak and daggercommand and controleach and everypart and parcellie, cheat, or stealname it and claim itrank and filesigned, sealed, and deliveredtic-tac-toefinders, keepers; losers, weeperscarpe diem, carpe noctem, carpe vitamin vino veritas, in aqua sanitasbrain and brawnmeat and potatoesrape and pillagedivide and conquertall, dark, and handsomepins and needlesbrains and beautyrock and rollspick and spanchalk and cheeseExamples of irreversible binomials that are not bicolons or tricolons:lost and foundbetween the devil and the deep blue seabetween a rock and a hard placedouble trouble (a verb and noun)high crimes and misdemeanorsover and done withSkull and crossbonessugar and spice and everything niceSee also

 Hendiatris
Figure of speech
 Rule of three (writing)
 Triad (disambiguation)

 References 
 Citations 

 Sources 

 Baldrick, Chris. 2008. Oxford Dictionary of Literary Terms. Oxford University Press. New York. 
 Corbett, Edward P. J. and Connors, Robert J. 1999. Style and Statement. Oxford University Press. New York, Oxford. 
 Kennedy, X.J. et al. 2006. The Longman Dictionary of Literary Terms: Vocabulary for the Informed Reader. Pearson, Longman. New York. 
 Forsyth, Mark. 2014. The Elements of Eloquence. Berkley Publishing Group/Penguin Publishing. New York. 
 Corbett, Edward P.J. Classical Rhetoric for the Modern Student''. Oxford University Press, New York, 1971.
 

Rhetorical techniques
Figures of speech